She Hangs Brightly is the debut studio album by American alternative rock band Mazzy Star. It was released on May 21, 1990, by Rough Trade Records and re-released by Capitol Records later in the year.

"Blue Flower" was released as a single and reached number 29 on the Billboard Alternative Songs chart. Four years later, "Halah" reached number 19 on the same chart after the success of "Fade into You".

The album cover is a shot of the interior of Hôtel Tassel in Brussels.

Composition

It showcases the band's trademark effect with haunting guitar work and lyrics, and Hope Sandoval's detached vocals. David Roback's Robby Krieger-inspired psychedelic blues slide guitar style can be heard on the song "Free". "Ghost Highway" is another psychedelic rock track, with a fast rhythm. This song dates from the band's days as Opal and was initially slated to be the title track of Opal's second album. While not a commercial success, this album did establish Mazzy Star as a unique band with a unique sound.

"Blue Flower" is a Slapp Happy cover from the 1972 album Sort Of.

Critical reception

In a review for Rolling Stone, Gina Arnold praised She Hangs Brightly as being "coldly beautiful". AllMusic's Jason Ankeny described Hope Sandoval's vocals as "more sultry" than those of Opal's Kendra Smith and praised "Halah" and "Blue Flower" but criticized the album's lack of focus, calling the remaining tunes "unmemorable".

Kurt Cobain of Nirvana listed She Hangs Brightly in his top fifty albums of all time. In 2018, Pitchfork ranked the album at number 29 on its list of the 30 best dream pop albums.

Track listing

Personnel
Credits for She Hangs Brightly adapted from album liner notes.

Musicians
William Cooper
Suki Ewers
Sylvia Gomez
Keith Mitchell
Paul Olguin
David Roback
Hope Sandoval

Technical personnel
David Roback – production
Merlyn Rosenberg – photography
Mazzy Star – cover design

References

Mazzy Star albums
1990 debut albums
Capitol Records albums